Doctor, in comics, may refer to the following:

The Doctor (Wildstorm), a name given to several characters in the WildStorm universe
Doctor (Doctor Who), the main character in a number of comic adventures chiefly in Doctor Who Magazine
 
It may also refer to:

Doctor Alchemy, a DC Comics supervillain and Flash rogue
Doctor Angst, a Marvel Comics character and leader of the Band of the Bland
Doctor Bedlam, a DC Comics supervillain and part of Jack Kirby's Fourth World
Doctor Cyber, a DC Comics supervillain
Doctor Death (comics), a DC Comics supervillain and enemy of Batman
Doctor Decibel, a Marvel Comics character
Doctor Destiny, a DC Comics villain
Doctor Doom, a Marvel Comics supervillain
Doctor Doomsday, an Amalgam Comics character
Doctor Druid, a Marvel Comics hero
Doctor Eclipse, a Valiant Comics character
Doctor Fang, a DC Comics character
Doctor Faustus (comics), a Marvel Comics supervillain associated with Captain America
Doctor Fate, a DC Comics sorcerer
Doctor Gorpon, a Malibu Comics character
Doctor Impossible, a DC Comics supervillain
Doctor Light, a number of comics characters of a similar name
Doctor McNinja from The Adventures of Dr. McNinja
Doctor Manhattan, a DC Comics character from Watchmen
Doctor Mid-Nite, a DC Comics hero
Doctor John Miers PHD, an all-round Comics hero
Doctor Mirage, a Valiant Comics character
Doctor Mist, a DC Comics superhero
Doctor Nemesis, two Marvel Comics characters: Dr. James Bradley, a scientist and co-inventor of the original Human Torch and Michael Stockton, a scientist who used Pym particles
Doctor Occult, a DC Comics character
Doctor Octopus, a Marvel Comics supervillain, known as an enemy of Spider-Man
Doctor Phosphorus, a DC Comics supervillain
Doctor Polaris, a DC Comics supervillain and enemy of Green Lantern
Doctor Psycho, a DC Comics supervillain and enemy of Wonder Woman who went on to become a core member of the Secret Society of Supervillains
Doctor Shocker, a DC Comics supervillain and member of the 1000
Doctor Sivana, a Fawcett and DC comics supervillain
Doctor Spectro, a Charlton and DC comics supervillain
Doctor Spectrum, a number of different Marvel Comics characters
Doctor Strange, a Marvel Comics hero
Doctor Sun, a Marvel Comics supervillain
Doctor Thirteen, a DC Comics character
Doctor Tomorrow, an Acclaim Comics series and a character in the game Freedom City
Doctor Vault, a Marvel Comics character
Doctor Voodoo, also known as Brother Voodoo, a Marvel Comics hero.
Doctor X (comics), a Nedor Comics character who returned in Terra Obscura
Doctor Zodiac, a DC Comics character from World's Finest Comics

Doc in comics may refer to:
Doc (comics), a member of the Omega Men
Doc (G.I. Joe), a G.I. Joe character who has appeared in the comic book spin-offs
Doc Samson, a Marvel Comics character
Doc Savage, a character who has appeared in a number of comics
Doc Strange, a Nedor Comics character who reappeared in Terra Obscura

See also
Doctor (disambiguation)

References